The 2005 Grand Prix motorcycle racing season was the 57th F.I.M. Road racing World Championship season. The season consisted out of 17 races for the MotoGP class and 16 for the 125cc and 250cc classes, beginning with the Spanish motorcycle Grand Prix on 10 April and ending with the Valencian Community motorcycle Grand Prix on 6 November.

Season summary

MotoGP class

The MotoGP championship was won by Valentino Rossi on a Yamaha. It was a season which featured a lot of dramatic races including four rain-affected races in Portugal, China, France and Great Britain. It also saw the domination of Rossi with a total of 16 podiums out of 17 races, out of which 11 of them were wins. He defeated Marco Melandri by a distant 147 points in the championship.

250cc class

The 250cc title was won by Daniel Pedrosa on a Honda.

125cc class
The 125cc title was won by Thomas Lüthi on a Honda. He won the World championship dramatically, when Mika Kallio's teammate Gábor Talmácsi overtook Kallio at the last corner in Qatar. Kallio would have got five points more, and then the points total would be 242–242, but Kallio would have won the title with more wins (4-5).

2005 Grand Prix season calendar
On 20 August 2004, the FIM released the initial 2005 calendar. In it, the South African and Rio Grand Prix were still on the calendar. On 10 October 2004, the FIM confirmed the 2005 calendar. In it, the Rio Grand Prix won out over the South African round, initially being scheduled on the 17th of April. The date of the Malaysian GP was also moved from 9 October to 11 September. On 22 December 2004, changes were made to the calendar. Multiple dates were altered: the date of the Italian GP was moved from 29 May to 5 June, the Catalan GP from 5 to 12 June, the British GP from 19 June to 24 July, the German GP from 24 to 31 July and the Malaysian GP from 11 to 25 September. The Rio GP was also still subject to confirmation. On 18 February 2005, more changes were made. Because no contract was signed for the Rio GP, the round was dropped and the Turkish GP was added instead. The date of the Portuguese GP was moved from 30 October to 17 April as well. By this time, the race was also subject to confirmation.

The following Grands Prix were scheduled to take place in 2005:

 † = MotoGP class only
 †† = Saturday race

Calendar changes
 The South African and Rio de Janeiro Grands Prix were taken off the calendar. The South African Grand Prix will return on 2023 at the Kyalami.
 The Portuguese Grand Prix was moved forward, from 5 September to 17 April.
 The Chinese Grand Prix and Turkish Grands Prix were added to the calendar.
 The United States Grand Prix was added to the calendar, but only the MotoGP class raced due to a Californian law on air pollution banning 2 stroke engines.

Regulation changes
The following changes are made to the regulation for the 2005 season:

Sporting regulations

 A new 'flag-to-flag' rule has been introduced. This means that, in the event of rain, the race will not be stopped and instead will be allowed to change bikes. This rule will only count for the MotoGP class.
 A new white flag has been introduced. If this flag is waved at a marshal post during the race, all riders are allowed to change bikes.
 Changes have been made to the starting procedure. Unless the race is interrupted, after the leading rider has crossed the finish line at the end of his first lap, the riders are not allowed to change their bikes in the MotoGP class. If a race has been declared 'wet', riders are allowed to change a bike equipped with a rain tyre to a bike with an intermediate or slick tyre or vice versa, or from a bike equipped with a slick tyre to a bike equipped with an intermedia or rain tyre is allowed at any time during a race. However, if a race has not been declared 'wet', the change of bikes are only allowed after the new white flag is shown around the circuit. In both cases, aids such as tyre warmers, the replacement of tyres and general adjustments are allowed on the bike in the pits. During the ride through the pits, all riders must respect the speed limit of 60 km/h from the start to the end of the sign. In the pits, overtaking is forbidden and any rider who breaks this rule will be fined 100 U.S. Dollar for the first offence and 500 U.S. Dollar for ensuing offences at the same place. Any rider who breaks this rule during a race will be penalised with a ride through penalty. In the case of an infringement, the Race Direction must communicate the offence to the team of the rider after having received the information. The rules will not be changed for the 125cc and 250cc classes.
 All races will be categorised as either 'wet' or 'dry'. A board might be displayed on the grid to show the current status of the race. If no board is displayed, the race is automatically considered 'dry'. The purpose of this classification is to indicate to all the riders the consequence of varying conditions during the race.
 An update has been made to the yellow flag rule. In case of danger, riders must already slow down, be prepared to stop if needed and are forbidden to overtake until the green flag is shown. If this rule is infringed upon, the lap time of the rider will be cancelled. New in this case is, in case of a violation of the rule during the race, the rider must return to his position prior to his pass. The penalty will first be communicated to the team, who then displays a board for the rider on the finish line during a maximum of three laps. If the rider does not go back to his previous position after the board has been shown to him three times, he will be penalised via a ride through penalty. In both cases, further penalties such as a fine or suspension can also be implemented. If a rider realises that he did an infraction immediately after having overtaken another rider, he must raise his hand and let the rider(s) past that he had overtaken. If he does this, no penalty will be imposed. During the final lap of inspection, this flag must be waved at the exact place where the flag marshal will be placed during the practices and races.
 A new age limit will come into effect for the 125cc class. From now on, the minimal age of entry for the class will be 19 years and 21 weeks old.
 A limit will be imposed on the maximum number of team personnel on the pit lane. The maximum number of team personnel per rider in the pits has been limited to four for all classes.
 Each team which is a member of the IRTA must submit an entry for their team by the 28th of February of the year in question. An exception is made when special dispensation is granted, which is valid for all races in the FIM Road Racing World Championship Grand Prix. At the same time, the team must specify the designated riders and the class in which they will participate, as well as the circuits used for testing designated by teams in the 125cc and 250cc classes.
 Practice restrictions have been introduced. Contracted teams and their designated riders who profit from a Participation Agreement to take part in the MotoGP class are forbidden from practicing at any circuit from 1 December of one year and 20 January of the next year, both dates being inclusive. Contracted teams and their designated riders who profit from a Participation Agreement to take part in the 125cc and 250cc classes may only participate in winter testing (tests between the end of the season and the first event of the following season), at circuits in the continental zone where the team is located (Europe, Asia/Oceania, Africa and the Americas).
 Contracted teams and their designated riders who profit from a Participation Agreement in any class are forbidden from practicing:
 - at any circuit included on the calendar of the current year after the date that is fourteen days prior to the start of the first race of the season.
 - at any circuit included on the calendar of the cuttent year during "breaks". A break is defined as 'two consecutive weekends where events are not scheduled'. The period of the break begins from 09:00 on the Wednesday after the last grand prix until the following grand prix.

The following exceptions will apply to the rule:
 - Free practice or qualifying practice at the event.
 - Practice at any circuit after the event at that circuit except during a break.
 - Official practice sessions organised by the IRTA.
 - Practice by contracted teams and their designated riders who profit from a Participation Agreement to participate in the 125cc and 250cc classes, at the two testing circuits appointed by each team which may take place up to fourteen days before the scheduled race for the circuit, except for when there is a break.

 Practice restrictions do not apply to wild card riders. An exception is made to a practice session or race at any circuit within fourteen days of a race.

This rule was additionally added on the 30th of August 2005:

 A change has been made to the start procedure if a race has been interrupted. In case of a normal start, the riders will now only be allowed to do a single warm-up lap ahead of the restart instead of the previous two.

Technical regulations

 All fuel tanks must be filled with material that is fire retardant or be lined with a fuel cell bladder. All fuel tanks made out of any metallic material such as steel, aluminium and so on, must be filled with material that is fire retardant or be lined with a fuel cell bladder. In the MotoGP class, all fuel tanks made out of any composite material such as carbon fibre, aramid fibre and so on, must have passed the FIM standards for fuel tanks and be lines with a fuel cell bladder. Any fuel tanks made out of composite material must have a label verifying that it conforms to the FIM Fuel Tank test standards. These labels must include the fuel tank manufacturer's name, the take of the tank manufacturer and the name of the testing laboratory. Full details of the standards are available from the FIM.
 The fuel tank capacity for all four-stroke bikes will be reduced from 24 to 22 litres.

2005 Grand Prix season results

 † = MotoGP class only
 †† = Saturday race

Participants

MotoGP participants

250cc participants

125cc participants

Standings

MotoGP riders' standings
Scoring system
Points were awarded to the top fifteen finishers. A rider had to finish the race to earn points.

 Rounds marked with a light blue background were under wet race conditions or stopped by rain.
 Riders marked with light blue background were eligible for Rookie of the Year awards.

250cc riders' standings

Scoring system
Points were awarded to the top fifteen finishers. A rider had to finish the race to earn points.

 Rounds marked with a light blue background were under wet race conditions or stopped by rain.
 Riders marked with light blue background were eligible for Rookie of the Year awards.

125cc riders' standings
Scoring system
Points were awarded to the top fifteen finishers. A rider had to finish the race to earn points.

 Rounds marked with a light blue background were under wet race conditions or stopped by rain.
 Riders marked with light blue background were eligible for Rookie of the Year awards.

Constructors' standings
Scoring system
Points were awarded to the top fifteen finishers. A rider had to finish the race to earn points.
 

 Each constructor gets the same number of points as their best placed rider in each race.
 Rounds marked with a light blue background were under wet race conditions or stopped by rain.

MotoGP

250cc

125cc

Teams' standings
 Each team gets the total points scored by their two riders, including replacement riders. In one rider team, only the points scored by that rider will be counted. Wildcard riders do not score points.
 Rounds marked with a light blue background were under wet race conditions or stopped by rain.

MotoGP

References

Sources
 

 
Grand Prix motorcycle racing seasons
2005 in motorcycle sport